Gökhan Attaroğlu (born 19 July 1965) is a Turkish swimmer. He competed in six events at the 1984 Summer Olympics.

References

External links
 

1965 births
Living people
Turkish male swimmers
Olympic swimmers of Turkey
Swimmers at the 1984 Summer Olympics
20th-century Turkish people
21st-century Turkish people